Cheshmeh-ye Hajji Soleyman (also Romanized as Cheshmeh-ye Ḩājjī Soleymān; also known as Cheshmeh-ye Soleymān and Cheshmeh) is a village in Doruneh Rural District, Anabad District, Bardaskan County, Razavi Khorasan Province, Iran. At the 2006 census, its population was 186, in 43 families.

References 

Populated places in Bardaskan County